Miloslav Rolko (born 13 October 1960) is a Slovak former swimmer who swam for Czechoslovakia at the 1976 and 1980 Olympics. At the 1977 European Championships, he won the 100 backstroke, and finished second in the 200 back.

In 1982, he, along with Vlastimil Černý, Tereza Vrtiskova and Josef Kuf (all swimmers), defected from Czechoslovakia following at meet in Sindelfingen, West Germany.

As of 2012, he is currently the Federal Junior coach for Luxembourg, working with FLNS. His daughter, Sarah, swam for Luxembourg at the 2009 European Junior Championships.

See also
:cs:Miloslav Rolko—entry from Czech Wikipedia

References

1960 births
Living people
Slovak male swimmers
Male backstroke swimmers
Male butterfly swimmers
Male medley swimmers
Olympic swimmers of Czechoslovakia
Swimmers at the 1976 Summer Olympics
Swimmers at the 1980 Summer Olympics
European Aquatics Championships medalists in swimming
Czechoslovak male swimmers
Universiade medalists in swimming
Universiade bronze medalists for Czechoslovakia
Medalists at the 1979 Summer Universiade
Medalists at the 1981 Summer Universiade
Sportspeople from Bratislava